Allahabad North is a constituency of the Uttar Pradesh Legislative Assembly covering the city of Allahabad North in the Prayagraj district of Uttar Pradesh, India.
  
Allahabad North is one of five assembly constituencies in the Phulpur Lok Sabha constituency. Since 2008, this assembly constituency is numbered 262 amongst 403 constituencies.

Currently this seat belongs to Bharatiya Janta Party candidate Harshvardhan Bajpai who won in last Assembly election of 2017 Uttar Pradesh Legislative Elections defeating Indian National Congress candidate Anugrah Narayan Singh by a margin of 35,025 votes.

Members of Legislative Assembly

Election results

2022

2017

References

External links
 

Assembly constituencies of Uttar Pradesh
Politics of Allahabad